The 1974 San Diego State Aztecs football team represented San Diego State University during the 1974 NCAA Division I football season as a member of the Pacific Coast Athletic Association.

The team was led by head coach Claude Gilbert, in his second year, and played home games at San Diego Stadium in San Diego, California. They finished the season as Conference Champion for the third consecutive year, with a record of eight wins, two losses and one tie (8–2–1, 4–0 PCAA).

Schedule

Team players in the NFL
The following were selected in the 1975 NFL Draft.

The following finished their college career in 1974, were not drafted, but played in the NFL.

Team awards

Notes

References

San Diego State
San Diego State Aztecs football seasons
Big West Conference football champion seasons
San Diego State Aztecs football